Fulvous  is a colour, sometimes described as dull orange, brownish-yellow or tawny; it can also be likened to a variation of buff, beige or butterscotch.  As an adjective it is used in the names of many species of birds, and occasionally other animals, to describe their appearance. It is also used as in mycology to describe fungi with greater colour specificity, specifically the pigmentation of the surface cuticle, the broken flesh and the spores en masse.

The first recorded use of fulvous as a colour name in English was in the year 1664. Fulvous in English is derived from the Latin "fulvus", a term that can be recognised in the scientific binomials of several species, and can provide a clue to their colouration.

Birds

 Fulvous babbler
 Fulvous owl
 Fulvous parrotbill
 Fulvous shrike-tanager
 Fulvous whistling duck
 Fulvous wren
 Fulvous-bellied antpitta
 Fulvous-breasted flatbill
 Fulvous-breasted woodpecker
 Fulvous-chested jungle-flycatcher
 Fulvous-chinned nunlet
 Fulvous-crested tanager
 Fulvous-dotted treerunner
 Fulvous-headed brush-finch
 Fulvous-headed tanager
 Fulvous-vented euphonia
 Gyps fulvus, the griffon vulture
 Pluvialis fulva, the Pacific golden plover
 Mulleripicus fulvus, the ashy woodpecker
 Petrochelidon fulva, the cave swallow

Reptiles

 Thamnophis fulvus, the Mesoamerican highlands gartersnake

Mammals
 Fulvous harvest mouse
 Fulvous pygmy rice rat
 Fulvous-bellied climbing rat
 Fulvus roundleaf bat
 Eulemur fulvus, the common brown lemur
 Spermophilus fulvus, the yellow ground squirrel

Fish
 Cephalopholis fulva, the coney
 Starksia fulva, the yellow blenny

Invertebrates

 Fulvous dawnfly
 Fulvous forest skimmer
 Dorylus fulvus, a West African ant
 Technomyrmex fulvus, a Central American ant
 Nylanderia fulva, a South American ant
 Paratrechina fulva, a South American ant
 Aphaenogaster fulva, a nearctic American ant
 Smicronyx fulvus, a sunflower seed weevil
 Tigriopus fulvus, a marine copepod
 Menemerus fulvus, a Japanese jumping spider
 Megahexura fulva, the tawny dwarf tarantula
 Euconulus fulvus, a New Zealand land snail
 Rhagonycha fulva, the common red soldier beetle
 Libellula fulva, the scarce chaser; a British dragon fly
 Aplysina fulva, a scattered pore rope sponge

Fungi
 Fomes fulvus, a North American conk
 Amanita fulva
 Mycovellosiella fulva,  a plant pathogen
 Byssochlamys fulva, a plant pathogen
  Cladosporium fulvum, a plant pathogen
 Xanthoria fulva, a lichen

Prokaryotes
 Myxococcus fulvus
 Pseudomonas fulva

Plants
 Plagiobothrys fulvus, fulvous popcorn flower
 Chrysopogon fulvus, red false beardgrass
 Hemerocallis fulva, tawny daylily
 Iris fulva, copper iris
 Polyscias fulva a West African parasol tree
 Ulmus fulva, slippery elm
 Quercus fulva, an endemic Mexican oak
 Utricularia fulva, an Australian carnivorous plant
 Livistona fulva, a palm having fronds with golden undersides
 Madhuca fulva, a threatened tree endemic to Sri Lanka
 Arachnorchis fulva, the tawny spider-orchid
 Arctophila fulva, arctic march grass

See also
 Animal colouration
 List of colours

References

External links

 Your Dictionary: Fulvous

Shades of red
Shades of yellow
Shades of brown
Bird colours